Fort MacKay/Firebag Aerodrome  is located  from the Firebag River, Alberta, Canada. The aerodrome was built to service the Firebag in-situ operation of Suncor Energy.

Airlines and destinations

References

External links
Page about this airport on COPA's Places to Fly airport directory

Registered aerodromes in Alberta
Transport in the Regional Municipality of Wood Buffalo